Chess Symbols is a Unicode block containing characters for fairy chess and related notations beyond the basic Western chess symbols in the Miscellaneous Symbols block, as well as symbols representing game pieces for xiangqi (Chinese chess).

Block

History
The following Unicode-related documents record the purpose and process of defining specific characters in the Chess Symbols block:

References 

Unicode blocks
Unicode blocks with characters for games
Xiangqi
Fairy chess